In functional analysis and related areas of mathematics, the Mackey topology, named after George Mackey, is the finest topology for a topological vector space which still preserves the continuous dual. In other words the Mackey topology does not make linear functions continuous which were discontinuous in the default topology. A topological vector space (TVS) is called a Mackey space if its topology is the same as the Mackey topology.

The Mackey topology is the opposite of the weak topology, which is the coarsest topology on a topological vector space which preserves the continuity of all linear functions in the continuous dual.

The Mackey–Arens theorem states that all possible dual topologies are finer than the weak topology and coarser than the Mackey topology.

Definition

Definition for a pairing

A linear map  is said to be Mackey continuous (with respect to pairings  and ) if  is continuous.

Definition for a topological vector space

The definition of the Mackey topology for a topological vector space (TVS) is a specialization of the above definition of the Mackey topology of a pairing. 

That is, the Mackey topology is the polar topology on  obtained by using the set of all weak*-compact disks in  

A linear map  between TVSs is Mackey continuous if  is continuous.

Examples

Every Hausdorff barreled locally convex space is Mackey.

Every Fréchet space  carries the Mackey topology and the topology coincides with the strong topology, that is

Applications

The Mackey topology has an application in economies with infinitely many commodities.

See also

Citations

Bibliography

 
  
 
  
 
 
  
 

Topological vector spaces